Omar Oucief Stadium, is a multi-purpose stadium in Aïn Témouchent, Algeria. It is currently used mostly for football matches.  The stadium has a capacity of 11,500 people.

The stadium was used as one of the venues for the 2013 African U-20 Championship.

References

External links 
 Stade Omar Oucief profile - soccerway.com

Football venues in Algeria
Multi-purpose stadiums in Algeria
Buildings and structures in Aïn Témouchent Province